Vladimir Bukovsky (born 30 December 1942) was prominent in the Soviet dissident movement of the 1960s and 1970s. A writer, neurophysiologist, and activist, he is celebrated for his part in the campaign to expose and halt the political abuse of psychiatry in the Soviet Union. Since being expelled from the USSR in late 1976 he has remained in active and vocal opposition to the Soviet system and the shortcomings of its successor regimes in Russia.

A list of publications by Vladimir Bukovsky in other languages is available below and on the website of the Gratitude Fund.

Books 
 To Build A Castle: My Life as a Dissenter (1978)
  352 pp.
 
 
 
 
 
 
 
 Vladimir Bukovsky and Pavel Stroilov (2004), EUSSR: The Soviet roots of European Integration, 48 pp. 
 Judgment in Moscow: Soviet Crimes and Western Hypocrisy (1995)

 Judgment in Moscow: Soviet crimes and Western complicity. Ninth of November Press. 2019. 729pp.

Untranslated

Other languages, 1970s to 2010s 
(French, German, Italian)

1970s

1980s

1990s
  616 pp.

2000s

References 

Bibliographies by writer
Bibliographies of Russian writers